Rhode may refer to: 

In Greek mythology:
Rhodos, goddess and personification of the island of Rhodes
Rhode, one of the fifty daughters of Danaus
Rhode (spider), a genus of spiders
Rhode (surname)
Rhode, County Offaly, an Irish town
Rhode, now Roses, Girona, Spain
Rhode, a suburb of Olpe, Germany
Rhode River, Maryland
Rhode-Saint-Genèse, a Belgian municipality

See also

Rhode Island, the smallest U.S. state by area
Rode (disambiguation)
Rhodes (disambiguation)
Rohde